Malina Joshi (born 27 January 1989) is a Nepali actress and Miss Nepal 2011. Joshi won the coveted title, beating Gurung, when she delivered an impressive answer about women's dominance to the judges, that sealed her spot in the competition. She represented Nepal in Miss World 2011 which was held on 4 November 2011 in London. She was selected to perform Nepalese folk dance in the final day of the competition. She was also on the top-30 for Beauty with a Purpose title, a major award at Miss World.

Early life
She finished her secondary education from Dharan Higher Secondary School and successfully achieved her MBA degree specialized in Marketing from Ace Institute of Management.

She was also among the top five finalists in Miss Angel 2010 contest. Although she did not win, she attained the Miss Intellect title award.

She also participated in Miss Asia Pacific world in 2013 where she ended as one of the 15 semi-finalists in the pageant held in Seoul, Korea.

Filmography

References

External links
 Miss Nepal 2011 Profile
 Miss Nepal official website
 Youth fm 96.8 felicitates Miss Nepal 2011

Living people
1989 births
People from Dharan
Miss World 2011 delegates
Miss Nepal winners
Nepalese female models
21st-century Nepalese actresses
Nepalese film actresses